The Lunar Injection Kool Aid Eclipse Conspiracy is the seventh studio album by American heavy metal musician Rob Zombie. The album was released on March 12, 2021, by Nuclear Blast. It received positive reviews upon release. It was Rob Zombie's first album to reach No. 1 at the Billboards Top Album Sales Chart in the US in the first week of its release.
It is the last album to feature long time guitarist John 5 before he began touring with Mötley Crüe.

Development

In 2018, Rob Zombie stated in an interview with "Whiplash", the KLOS radio show hosted by Full Metal Jackie, that the music on his upcoming album will be "much more complicated structurally". According to Rob, his goal on his next album has once again been to explore new territory without deviating too much from his tried-and-tested formula.

The original plan was to release the album in 2019. During an interview at January 2019, John 5 described the album at a Talk Toomey podcast as "hooky and musical, and badass. The best Zombie record to date—better than White Zombie anything…He went nuts on this one. I'm telling you, it's the best Zombie record you guys will hear. And we're going to have a big tour. We're going to do videos, and you know, I've been in the band with the guy forever and I just love him". Later in the same year with an interview with Revolver, John 5 said of the new music as "Heavy, very heavy. It's just a heavy Zombie record with great hooks. It's very, very musical, and a hard-hitting Zombie record. I think people are really gonna dig it. I'm a Zombie fan, and if I heard it, I'd be like, 'Oh my God, this is brutal.' I'm really excited about it!".

In the same year, Rob Zombie spoke about his much anticipated seventh album release to NME in 2019 saying that "The record's definitely finished and…I think it's the best record we've ever made. It's a very big, crazy and complex record that I'm really excited to finally be able to release. I just had to get everything with 3 From Hell completely finished before we got into that, but my plan now is to start shooting some big videos for the album around January so that we can release it early next year." Zombie's subsequent plan was to release the new album in February 2020.

Early October 2020, John 5 stated to Meltdown of Detroit's WRIF radio station about the status of Rob Zombie's long-awaited new studio album saying that "You will be seeing something soon," John 5 said. "That's all I say. Very, very, very soon. It's coming very soon… We're excited. I'm more excited than anyone, that's for sure." At the end of the same month, Rob Zombie announced the album's title as "The Lunar Injection Kool Aid Eclipse Conspiracy" and its track listing with a release date at March 12, 2021.

Commercial performance
This is the first studio album of Rob Zombie that reached No. 1 at the Billboard's Top Album Sales Chart with 26,000 copies sold in the U.S. in the week ending March 18. It also was Zombie's fourth No. 1 on Billboard's Top Rock Albums and Hard Rock Albums charts eclipsing his prior No. 5 best set with 1998's Hellbilly Deluxe, 2006's Educated Horses and 2016' Electric Warlock Acid Witch Satanic Orgy Celebration Dispenser.

Reception 

On Metacritic, the album has a rating of 64 out of 100 based on five reviews, indicating generally favourable reviews. Consequence of Sound reported that the "instrumentation and lyrics are equal parts memorable and evil. Let's face it, memorable and evil are two traits any fan would want from a Rob Zombie album" awarding the album a score of "B+". AllMusic gave the album 4.5 stars out of 5 writing that "Inscrutably titled and strange as ever, the veteran rock icon sticks close to his established aesthetic: a sexed-up, sci-fi, psychedelic gore-fest packed with ghoulish cult-horror schlock, breakneck riffs, and pummeling delivery." Kerrang! called the album "a familiar ride, but one that's hard to beat", awarding it a 3 out of 5 stars rating and criticising the album's length while praising the singles "The Triumph of King Freak (A Crypt of Preservation and Superstition)" and "The Eternal Struggles of the Howling Man" due to "their turbocharged drive". Rolling Stone though criticized Rob Zombie since he "offers the same disco-metal dreck he's been peddling for 30 years" and ultimately giving the record 1.5 out of 5 stars.

Track listing

Personnel 

Credited musicians include:

Rob Zombie
 Rob Zombie - vocals
 John 5 - guitars
 Piggy D. - bass
 Ginger Fish - drums

Additional musicians
 DJ Kron Garr - turntables
 Josh Freese - drums
 Keys Mahoney - keyboards

Charts

Weekly charts

Year-end charts

References

2021 albums
Rob Zombie albums
Nuclear Blast albums